Eichenwald may refer to:
 Eichenwald (surname)
 the German name (1936–1945) of Dąbrowa Łużycka
 Eichenwalde, a map from the video game Overwatch (video game)